Richard Conrad "Con" Cambie (born 1931) is a New Zealand natural products chemist known for his research into bioactive compounds.

Born in 1931 in Tauranga, Cambie was educated at Tauranga College. He attended Auckland University College, graduating with an MSc with first-class honours in 1955 and a PhD in 1958. Appointed to the staff of chemistry department at Auckland in 1958, Cambie then studied at the University of Oxford, where he was awarded a DPhil in 1963. He was awarded a DSc, on the basis of publications submitted, in 1964.

He returned to the University of Auckland and, following the retirement of Bob Briggs in 1969, he was appointed to a professorial chair. For 17 years he also served as assistant to the vice-chancellor (student services). On his retirement in 1996 Cambie was granted the title of professor emeritus.

He was elected a Fellow of the Royal Society of New Zealand in 1966, and the following year he was awarded the society's Hector Medal, New Zealand's highest science honour at that time. He is the author or co-author of 430 scientific papers.

Selected works

References

External links
 google scholar 
 institutional homepage

1931 births
Living people
People educated at Tauranga Boys' College
University of Auckland alumni
Alumni of the University of Oxford
New Zealand chemists
Academic staff of the University of Auckland
Fellows of the Royal Society of New Zealand
20th-century New Zealand scientists